Mathew Priest is an English musician and writer, best known as the drummer for Dodgy, a British pop-rock band who rose to prominence during the 1990s.

Priest has also worked as a session player, playing with the likes of The Lightning Seeds, The Electric Soft Parade, The Yellow Moon Band and Ian McNabb in The Icicle Works.

He has managed the bands Panama Kings (from Belfast), Hey Gravity (formerly called M.A.S.S., with current bandmate Andy Miller on guitar) and Misty's Big Adventure.

Priest contributes to Rhythm magazine in the UK, reviewing the demos sent in by readers. Priest's knowledge of music was shown during his appearances on BBC Television's Never Mind The Buzzcocks.

He was the presenter of the early Saturday morning show on BBC GLR called The Crack At Dawn for 14 months from 1998 until its changeover to speech based BBC London Live in 1999. To this day, he still appears on radio shows all across the country, most recently on Soho Radio.

In 2010–11, Priest co-presented, co-produced and is responsible for the music playlist for Live and Local on Spire FM on Sunday evenings, which reports on the local cultural and music scene, getting a band to play a live session every week. They played new releases and classics.

In 2005, Dodgy reunited and have been touring and playing ever since. They have released two albums since the reunion.

He co-wrote and performed in the Edinburgh Fringe show 2 Drummers Drumming 2008, which received critical acclaim.

In 2017, Mathew was part of the house band on Matt Forde's new political show, Unspun with Matt Forde.

References

Year of birth missing (living people)
Living people
English rock drummers
Britpop musicians
The Icicle Works members
The Lightning Seeds members
The Electric Soft Parade members
Dodgy members
21st-century drummers